Sheikh Shaheb Ali (1 July 1917 – 1 June 2004) was a former Bangladeshi football player and manager. He is the only East Pakistani to have both played for and managed the Pakistan national football team. He is also the first head coach of the Bangladesh national football team, guiding them at the 1973 Merdeka Cup. He also holds the record of coaching Bangladesh to their first ever win in international football.

Playing career
Sheikh Shaheb Ali was born in Matuail area of Dhaka, on 1 July 1917. He started his career at Kabi Nazrul Government College, where he was a student and after graduation joined the newly formed Dhaka Mohammedan SC. During the British regime he played in the unrecognised era of the Dhaka Football League and also participated in the Ronald Shield with Victoria SC as a guest player. He also played one game for Kolkata Mohammedan SC in 1945, after impressing the clubs football secretary Abdul Rashid and captain Mohammad Shahjahan while playing for Dhaka XI during an invitational tournament. After the partition of India, he played for Dhaka Wanderers in the Dhaka League, and was league champion in both 1950 and 1951. He played in the 1955 IFA Shield, as a guest player for Dhaka Wanderers. Eventually, Ali was called up to the Pakistan national football team alongside another Bengali player, Nabi Chowdhury, for the 1954 Asian Games in Manila, Philippines. He retired from playing in 1957 after captaining East Pakistan Green team at the Pakistan National Championship.

Coaching career

Ali started his career as a referee in 1943 and beacame a FIFA referee by 1962, while working with the Pakistan Football Federation which he joined in 1958. He later trained both the East Pakistan and Dhaka University football teams. He was made caretaker coach of the Pakistan national football team at the 1960 Merdeka Cup, where Pakistan finished in fourth place by claiming victories against both Japan and Thailand. After the Independence of Bangladesh, Ali guided the President's XI team against Bangladesh XI, in the first football match in the newly liberated country, on 13 February 1972. Ali's President's XI team won the game 2–0 with goals from Golam Sarwar Tipu and Scooter Gafoor. On 13 May 1972, Ali was head coach of "Dhaka XI", who were the unofficial Bangladesh national team (not affiliated with a FIFA Confederation), against Mohun Bagan. Dhaka XI striker Kazi Salahuddin scored the only goal in front of more than 35,000 spectators at the Dhaka Stadium. Later that year, he again coached Dhaka XI, travelling to India's Guwahati to take part in the Bordoloi Trophy. The team finished runners-up behind East Bengal Club.

In July 1973, Ali travelled to Malaysia as the head coach of the first Bangladesh national football team, when they took part in the Merdeka Cup. Bangladesh tied their first two games, 2–2 against Thailand and 1–1 against South Vietnam. Other than the 0–6 thrashing at the hands of Burma the team managed respectable results losing 1–2 against Kuwait and drawing with Singapore (1–1). They finished their Malaysia tour with a 0–2 defeat against Thailand. On their way back, Ali's side played a friendly in Singapore and earned their first international football win by defeating the hosts 1–0. In September 1979, Ali was put incharge of the national team again, as Bangladesh partook in the 
Korean President's Cup, during the tournament Ali guided Bangladesh to only their third ever international victory, with a 3–1 thrashing of Sri Lanka. However, his side also suffered their biggest ever defeat, as hosts South Korea outplayed them with a 9–0 scoreline. Ali was the technical advisor of BJMC in 1979 and head coach of Azad Sporting Club in 1983. He retired from all football activities after working with the executive committee of the Bangladesh Football Federation from 1992 to 1993.

Personal life
Ali was one of the architects behind Sonali Otit Club, which is an organisation made of former footballers.

On 1 June 2004, Ali died in his home in Gopibagh, Dhaka. He left behind his wife, three sons and six daughters.

Managerial statistics

Honours

Players
Dhaka Wanderers Club
Dhaka League = 1950, 1951

Manager
Dhaka XI
Bordoloi Trophy runner-up = 1972

Awards and accolades
1977 − National Sports Awards.

See also
Football in Bangladesh

Bibliography
পাকিস্তান জাতীয় দল বাঙালি খেলোয়াড় (Bengali players in the Pakistan national team)

References

External links
 Sheikh Shaheb Ali at Sonali Otit Club.com

1917 births
2004 deaths
People from Dhaka
Bangladeshi footballers
Association football defenders
Pakistani footballers
Pakistan international footballers
Mohammedan SC (Dhaka) players
Mohammedan SC (Kolkata) players
Asian Games competitors for Pakistan
Footballers at the 1954 Asian Games
Calcutta Football League players
Bangladeshi football managers
Bangladesh national football team managers
Pakistan national football team managers
Bangladeshi football coaches
Bangladeshi football referees
Recipients of the Bangladesh National Sports Award